Kyoto International Junior and Senior High School (Kyōto Kokusai Chūgakkō Kōtōgakkō) is a Korean international school in Higashiyama-ku, Kyoto. It includes middle and high school levels. It is under the Educational Foundation Kyoto International School.

See also
Japanese international schools in South Korea:
 Japanese School in Seoul
 Busan Japanese School

References

External links
 Educational Foundation Kyoto International School
  Educational Foundation Kyoto International School
  Educational Foundation Kyoto International School
 

International schools in Kyoto
Korean international schools in Japan
High schools in Kyoto Prefecture